Larisa Turchinskaya (née Nikitina on 29 April 1965) is a retired Russian heptathlete.

Career 
Her personal best result is 7007 points, achieved on 10–11 June 1989 in Bryansk. This result remained the European record, until Carolina Klüft achieved 7032 points at the 2007 World Championships in Athletics. This performance still ranks Turchinskaya fourth on the world all time-performers list.

She was the runner-up at the 1994 Hypo-Meeting with a score of 6596 points.

Turchinskaya won a silver medal at the 1990 Goodwill Games, but was later disqualified, after having tested positive for amphetamines.

Turchinskaya was born in Russia, where she married the strongman and media personality Vladimir Turchinsky. In the early 1990s, after competing in Australia she decided to settle in the country.

International competitions

References 

1965 births
Living people
People from Kostroma
Russian heptathletes
Soviet heptathletes
Soviet female athletes
Russian female athletes
World Athletics Championships athletes for the Soviet Union
World Athletics Championships athletes for Russia
World Athletics Championships medalists
Doping cases in athletics
Russian sportspeople in doping cases
Soviet sportspeople in doping cases
Universiade medalists in athletics (track and field)
Goodwill Games medalists in athletics
Universiade gold medalists for the Soviet Union
Medalists at the 1989 Summer Universiade
Competitors at the 1994 Goodwill Games
Sportspeople from Kostroma Oblast